FK Jedinstvo is a Serbian football club based in Donja Mutnica, Serbia.

History

Current team

Jedinstvo Donja Mutnica